Plaines Wilhems   is a district of Mauritius. It is the most populous district, with its population estimated at 366,506 as the end of 2018. The district is mainly urban; it consists of four towns, the village of Midlands and part of two other villages. The Plaines Wilhems district does not have a District Council; it has four Municipal Town Councils. The towns are Beau-Bassin Rose-Hill, Curepipe, Quatre Bornes and Vacoas-Phoenix. The villages are Midlands, Cascavelle (East - West in Rivière Noire district) and Moka (West- East in Moka district). The district was named after Wilhem Leicknig.  Of Prussian origin, he settled on the island of Mauritius, then known as Isle de France, in 1721.

Education

Secondary schools in the district include:
 Lycée La Bourdonnais - Curepipe
 Lycée des Mascareignes- Moka
 Royal College Curepipe - Curepipe
 Queen Elizabeth College - Beau-Bassin Rose-Hill
 Collège du Saint-Esprit - Quatre-Bornes

See also

Districts of Mauritius
List of places in Mauritius

References

 
 
Districts of Mauritius